MTV Pantaloons Style Super Stars is an Indian Fashion reality television series, which premiered on 2 February 2019 and broadcast on MTV India. The viewers will see the contestants compete for the title of Pantaloons Next Style Super Stars, providing them with an opportunity to begin their career in the fashion industry. The series is hosted by Benafsha Soonawalla, judged by Sana Saeed, Shruti Seth and Arjun Kanungo.

The show returned for its second season on 6 December 2019 and was directed by Pushkin Varma

Host & Judges

Season Details

Season 1

Contestants
Seven finalists were chosen from several auditions from around India - Lucknow, Ahmedabad, Pune, Delhi, Mumbai, Indore and Dehradun.

Episode Summary

Call-out Order 

 The contestant was eliminated
 The contestant won the competition

Season 2

Contestants
Nine finalists were chosen from several auditions from around India - Pune, Kolkata, Lucknow, Ahmedabad, Delhi, Mumbai, Indore and Dehradun.

Episode Summary

Contestant Summary 

  The contestant won.
  The contestant was the runner-up.
  The contestant was eliminated during the final.
 The contestant won the challenge.
 The contestant was 2nd best in the challenge.
 The contestant was saved by the Judges.
 The contestant was in the bottom.
 The contestant was eliminated.
 The contestant returned as a guest for journey episode.

References 

2019 Indian television series debuts
Indian reality television series
MTV (Indian TV channel) original programming